The Crawford family murder was the July 1970 killing of pregnant mother Therese Crawford and her three children at their home in Glenroy, Victoria, Australia. The family car was located at the bottom of a cliff at Loch Ard Gorge in Port Campbell on 2 July with the bodies of the four victims still inside.

The husband and father of the decedents, Elmer Kyle Crawford (b. May 1930), who has not been seen since the incident, is the prime suspect in the murders.

Investigation
Two weeks before the murders, Elmer Crawford, an employee of the Victoria Racing Club (VRC), and his wife, 35-year-old Therese Crawford, drafted new wills that left a considerable fortune to Elmer Crawford in the event of his family's death. At the time of the murders, the couple had three children: Katherine Jane (aged 12), James William (aged 8), and Karen Jean (aged 6). It is believed by investigators that the impending arrival of their fourth child and Therese's mental state were the triggers for the murders. Another factor could have been the theft of goods by Crawford from the VRC.

A July 1971 coroner's inquest found that Crawford, who had emigrated from Ireland in 1951, murdered his wife and three children at the family's home in Cardinal Road, Glenroy. Crawford had constructed an electrocution device, using a  length of electrical lead and alligator clips, which he attached to his wife's ears while she slept before electrocuting her. He then battered Karen to death, presumably using the hammer found in the car, and electrocuted both Katherine and James.

Crawford then loaded the blanket-wrapped bodies, along with a motorbike, fuel cans, rifle, and hose, into the family's Holden FE sedan (the back seat had also been removed). He then drove them  to Port Campbell, where he connected the hose from the exhaust to the driver's side window before pushing the car over the cliff edge in an effort to frame his wife by making the crime look like a murder-suicide. To aid the vehicle's movement, he had also laid a stone pathway across a drainage ditch in front of the vehicle.

Search 
Crawford, who was last seen in his driveway on the day of the vehicle's discovery, has been missing since the murders, although he was reportedly spotted in 1994 in Western Australia by an acquaintance. A reward of A$100,000 was offered in 2008 for information leading to his arrest. In July 2010, Victorian Police announced that they were, in conjunction with the FBI, attempting to identify a man, via facial recognition technology, who died in 2005 in San Angelo, Texas, United States, that they believed to be Crawford. The man had no fingerprints and carried multiple identity documents. It was announced on 27 August 2010 that comparison of DNA from a Crawford blood relative ruled out any connection to the body in Texas.

Media
An episode of Sensing Murder titled "Almost Perfect" which aired on 30 May 2006 featured the crime. Detailed investigation in Greg Fogarty's 2011 book, Almost Perfect: The True Story of the Crawford Family Murders, takes a close look at the case from the perspective of someone who lived in the same street at the time of the crime. The case was also detailed in a 2016 episode of Felon True Crime Podcast.

See also
 Cold case
 Crime in Australia
 Familicide
 List of fugitives from justice who disappeared
 List of unsolved murders

References

Cited works and further reading

External links
 Contemporary news article pertaining to the manhunt for Elmer Crawford
Crawford Murders 1970 - News report 2010

1970 murders in Australia
Familicides
Mass murder in 1970
Mass murder in Australia
Murder in Melbourne
Murdered Australian children
People murdered in Victoria (Australia)
Unsolved crimes in Australia
Unsolved murders in Australia